Cheshmeh Saleh (also Romanized as Cheshmeh Şāleḩ) is a village in Honam Rural District, in the Central District of Selseleh County, Lorestan Province, Iran. At the 2006 census, its population was 44, in 10 families.

References 

Towns and villages in Selseleh County